Ibrahim Barssi (born 1970) is a Sudanese artist. Barssi was born in Sennar on the banks of the Blue Nile. He joined the Faculty of Fine Arts, Alexandria, Egypt. He worked as  an English language teacher in Sudan. He lives in Sydney, Australia.

References

1970 births
Living people
Sudanese artists
Sudanese emigrants to Australia
Sudanese contemporary artists
20th-century Sudanese artists
21st-century Sudanese artists
Date of birth missing (living people)